Fisiognomica is an album by Italian singer-songwriter Franco Battiato, released by EMI Music Italian in 1988.

The cover features  a photo of Battiato as an adolescent, when still living in Sicily. "L'Oceano di Silenzio" is an operatic song containing German text from Fleur Jaeggy's Wasserstatuen. "Veni l'autunnu" ("The Autumn Comes" in Sicilian) contains text both in Arabic and Sicilian, and is devoted to Battiato's homeland (which is also the inspiration of "Secondo imbrunire", meaning "Second Dusk"). Arabic lyrics are also contained in "Zai Saman". The title track is inspired to physiognomy theories.

"Nomadi" was written by Battiato's friend and 1970s collaborator Juri Camisasca, after his retirement in a Benedictine monastery. It was originally sung by Alice in her album Park Hotel (1986).

Track listing
 "Fisiognomica"
 "E ti vengo a cercare"
 "Veni l'autunnu"
 "Secondo imbrunire"
 "Nomadi"
 "Zai Saman"
 "Il mito dell'amore"
 "L'Oceano di Silenzio" - (from Fleur Jaeggy's Wasserstatuen)

Certifications

References

Franco Battiato albums
1988 albums
Italian-language albums